The women's 20,000 m elimination race in road speed skating at the 2017 World Games took place on 24 July 2017 at the Millennium Park in Wrocław, Poland.

Competition format
A total of 27 athletes entered the competition. Skaters have to race 34 laps.

Results

References 

Road speed skating at the 2017 World Games
2017 World Games